Anne-Louise Élie de Beaumont (1729 – 12 January 1783) was a French writer. She was the author of Letters from the Marquis de Roselle.

Biography
Beaumont was born Anne Louise Morin du Mesnil in Caen in 1729 the daughter of Huguenot Robert de Bérenger. Though she was raised a Catholic on the orders of Louis XV, her father was Protestant. He left France selling the family's estate at Mézidon-Canon. Her husband was Jean-Baptiste-Jacques Élie de Beaumont, a lawyer in the Calas affair and well known defender of religious freedom. They married in 1760. The couple had a son Arnaud 1772. They also regained the family estate through a legal battle. Beaumont wrote several books for publication and they have been translated into a number of languages including English and Dutch. She died in Paris in 1783.

Bibliography
 Letters from the Marquis de Roselle, 1761
 Anecdotes from the Court and the reign of Edward II, King of England, 1776

Sources

1729 births
1783 deaths
Writers from Caen